Hannam may refer to:

People
Edith Hannam (1878–1951), British tennis player
Ian Hannam (born 1956), British banker
John Hannam (born 1929), British politician
Ken Hannam (1929–2004), Australian film and television director
Walter Henry Hannam (1885-1965), Australian, wireless experimenter, Antarctic expeditioner, member ANZAC Wireless Coy.

Other
Hannam-dong, a district of Seoul, South Korea
Hannam station, on the Gyeongui-Jungang Line, South Korea
Hannam University, a private Christian university in Daejeon, South Korea
USS Hannam (PF-77), a United States Navy patrol frigate transferred to the United Kingdom while under construction which served in the Royal Navy from 1943 to 1945 as